Eike Christian Hirsch (6 April 1937 – 7 August 2022) was a German journalist, author and television presenter. He was host of a talk show and author of a biography about Gottfried Wilhelm Leibniz. The main themes in his books were religion, humour and German language.

Biography
Hirsch was born in Bilthoven, Netherlands, on 6 April 1937 and grew up in Göttingen. His playmates were the children of the family of Werner Heisenberg among others, and a classmate was a son of Carl Friedrich von Weizsäcker.

Hirsch studied theology and philosophy in Göttingen, Heidelberg, and finally in Basel with Karl Barth. He graduated to Dr. theol. with a work on Immanuel Kant, Höchstes Gut und Reich Gottes in Kants kritischen Hauptwerken als Beispiel für die Säkularisierung seiner Metaphysik (Highest good and Kingdom of God in Kant's main works as an example of the secularisation of his metaphysics). Up to 1996, he was an editor in sound broadcasting at the NDR and headed the "Religion and Society" department. He was later a freelance journalist. In the 1980s, he was the host of the talk show 3 nach 9. He wrote books on questions of faith and the German language. He also wrote a series of humorous word definitions, Deutsch für Besserwisser (German for know-it-alls), which were first published in Stern magazine, and later collected into book form.

In 2000, Hirsch wrote his opus magnum Der berühmte Herr Leibniz (The famous Mr. Leibniz) about the German polymath Gottfried Wilhelm Leibniz, who had worked in Hanover. A reviewer from the FAZ noted that Hirsch avoided speculation, but provided facts in rich detail in chronological narration.

Hirsch lived in Hanover. Hirsch was married to Doreen. Even in old age, he and his wife went to a fitness centre twice a week, and he relaxed with classical music such as Schubert's.

Hirsch died in Hannover on 7 August 2022 of a severe illness, at the age of 85.

Awards
In 1986, Hirsch was awarded the Kassel Literary Prize, for grotesque humour for his amusing interpretation (Der Witzableiter oder die Schule des Lachens, 1985). In 1992, he received the Lower Saxony State Prize (Niedersachsenpreis) for Journalism. In 2006, he received the  donated by the Sparkasse Hannover.

Works

References

Further reading

External links 

 
 Architektur als Heimat (in German) Lavesstiftung, award ceremony 28 February 2008
 Hirsch, Eike Christian: Händel unter Verdacht (in German) in: Göttinger Händel-Beiträge, vol 14, Vandenhoeck & Ruprecht, 2013, ISBN 978-3-64-727831-5
 Publicist Eike Christian Hirsch died at the age of 85  (translation of HAZ obituary) germany.detailzero.com 8 August 2022

1937 births
2022 deaths
20th-century German journalists
20th-century German male writers
21st-century German journalists
21st-century German male writers
German journalists
German male non-fiction writers
People from De Bilt